Manzanares is a town and municipality in the Colombian Department of Caldas.

Climate
Manzanares has a subtropical highland climate (Köppen Cfb). It has warm afternoons, pleasant mornings, and heavy rainfall year-round.

References

Municipalities of Caldas Department